Windows 10 May 2019 Update (also known as version 1903 and codenamed "19H1") is the seventh major update to Windows 10 and the first to use a more descriptive codename (including the year and the order released) instead of the "Redstone" or "Threshold" codename. It carries the build number 10.0.18362.

Version history
The first preview was released to Insiders who opted in to the exclusive Skip Ahead ring on July 25, 2018. The update began rolling out on May 21, 2019.
Notable changes in the May 2019 Update include:

A new "light theme"
Separation of Search and Cortana in the taskbar
Windows Sandbox (not available in Windows 10 Home)
Ability to pause updates for 35 days or under (incl. Windows 10 Home)
New default wallpaper
Recommended troubleshooting
Notifications hidden while in full-screen

The update reached end of service after the release of build 18362.1256 on December 8, 2020.

See also
Windows 10 version history

References

Windows 10
History of Microsoft
Software version histories